Thomas William Cavendish Lapslie (born 5 October 1995) is an English professional footballer who plays as a midfielder for  club Torquay United.

He joined Colchester United's Academy in 2012 for his scholarship, and made his professional debut for the club in January 2015. He made 170 appearances for the club between 2015 and 2021. He later joined Torquay United on his release from Colchester.

Career
Born in Waltham Forest, London, Lapslie won the Chelmsford Youth League Cup final at under-12 level for his side Ongar Juniors against Chelmsford Youth. His team won 1–0 at Billericay Town's New Lodge ground in 2008. He is also a graduate from the Chelmsford-based P.A.S.S. Academy.

Colchester United
After playing Sunday League football for Ongar Juniors and spending time with Maldon Town, Lapslie joined Colchester United's Academy at the age of 16, before signing a professional development contract with the club one year into his two-year scholarship alongside Michael O'Donoghue in April 2013. Then-academy manager Tony Humes described Lapslie as a "dynamic central midfielder" who is a "leader in the [youth] team". During the 2013–14 season, Lapslie featured regularly in the successful under-18 side, helping his team to a Youth Alliance South East league title and Youth Alliance Cup double, starting in the 4–2 final victory over Bradford City at Valley Parade on 29 April 2014.

Lapslie first travelled with the Colchester United first-team squad in December 2012, travelling to Bournemouth for their League One fixture, and travelled again in the 2014–15 season for a trip to Crewe Alexandra in September 2014, having been in good form for the under-21 development squad.

Lapslie made his professional debut for Colchester on 2 January 2015 in their FA Cup third round tie with Cardiff City at the Cardiff City Stadium, where he came on as a 64th-minute substitute for George Moncur in the 3–1 defeat. He then made his full debut and home debut on 24 January, starting and playing the full 90 minutes in Colchester's 2–0 relegation battle victory over Leyton Orient. Lapslie was thrust into the first-team for successive league matches, admitting that "I can't believe it at the moment, I have to keep pinching myself... being involved with the first team".

Lapslie scored his first senior goal on 21 February with the opening goal of Colchester's 3–2 win over Bristol City at the Colchester Community Stadium, heading in Elliott Hewitt's spilled cross. He made his tenth league start on 11 April in Colchester's 1–0 defeat by Coventry City, announcing that he "couldn't have imagined playing so many games, before this season started". He made twelve appearances in all competitions. He was then offered a three-year contract to extend his stay with the club until the summer of 2018, which he signed on 23 April.

Lapslie made his first appearance of the 2015–16 season on 17 October 2015 when he replaced Joe Edwards in the second half of a 5–0 defeat by Wigan Athletic at the DW Stadium. He scored his second goal for the club and his first of the season on 6 December, heading in an equaliser at 2–2 during Colchester's 3–2 FA Cup win over Altrincham at the Community Stadium. He made twelve first-team appearances for the club during the season.

Lapslie established himself in the first-team during the 2016–17 season, earning the Colchester United Young Player of the Year accolade at the club's end of season awards ceremony. He played 40 games for the first-team during the campaign.

Lapslie received the first red card of his career on 21 October 2017 against Coventry City. He was sent off for deliberate handball one minute after being shown a yellow card for a foul.

On 12 May 2018, Lapslie took up the option on his contract to remain with Colchester United for a further year until at least summer 2019. On 3 January 2019, he agreed a -year contract extension to commit himself to the club until summer 2021.

After his contract expired in May 2021, Lapslie was released by Colchester United. He had made 170 appearances and scored four goals since his professional debut in January 2015.

Torquay United
Following his release from Colchester United, Lapslie signed for National League side Torquay United on 19 July 2021.

Career statistics

Personal life
Lapslie is the older brother of Gillingham midfielder George Lapslie.

Honours
Colchester United U18
2013–14 Football League Youth Alliance South East winner
2013–14 Football League Youth Alliance Cup winner

Individual
2017 Colchester United Young Player of the Year

References

External links

1995 births
Living people
People from the London Borough of Waltham Forest
English footballers
Association football midfielders
Maldon & Tiptree F.C. players
Colchester United F.C. players
Torquay United F.C. players
English Football League players
National League (English football) players